Komtoèga is a town and seat of the Komtoèga Department of Boulgou Province in south-eastern Burkina Faso. As of 2005, the town has a population of 5,038.

References

Populated places in the Centre-Est Region
Boulgou Province